James Kay may refer to:

James Kay (British inventor) (1774–1857), British inventor
James J. Kay (1954–2004), ecological scientist and policy-maker
Sir James Kay-Shuttleworth, 1st Baronet (1804–1877), British politician and educationalist
James Kay (artist) (1858–1942), Scottish artist
James Franklin Kay (born 1948), American professor
James Ellsworth De Kay (1792–1851), American zoologist
James Kay (Kentucky politician) (born 1982), member of the Kentucky House of Representatives
James Kay (golfer) (1855–1927), Scottish golfer

See also
James Kaye (disambiguation)